Khalid Hajeyah (born 28 August 1992) is a Kuwaiti footballer who currently plays for Al-Qadsia as a defender. Son of Kuwait Football Legend and Manager Mohammed Ebrahim Hajeyah while his brother Ahmad El Ebrahim plays for rivals Al-Arabi SC

References 

1992 births
Living people
Kuwaiti footballers
Association football defenders
Kuwait international footballers
2015 AFC Asian Cup players
Sportspeople from Kuwait City
AFC Cup winning players
Kuwait Premier League players